Intercurrence Island is an island  long, the largest of the Christiania Islands, lying  east-northeast of Liège Island at the northeastern end of the Palmer Archipelago, off the northwestern coast of the Antarctic Peninsula. Though the origin of this name is unknown, it has appeared on maps for over a hundred years and its usage has been established internationally.

See also 
 Babel Rock
 Franklin Point
 List of Antarctic and subantarctic islands

References

Islands of the Palmer Archipelago